Samuel Cooper is a fictional character on the CBS crime drama Criminal Minds: Suspect Behavior, portrayed by Forest Whitaker. He is the Unit Chief within the FBI's Behavioral Analysis Unit in Quantico, Virginia, who works with a non-traditional team called the Red Cells. His first appearance in the CBS crime drama was in the episode "The Fight" in the fifth season.

Background
David Rossi from Criminal Minds says that he has known Cooper for 20 years.

Criminal Minds
In the episode "The Fight", Cooper calls BAU Supervisory Special Agent Aaron Hotchner to come to Washington, D.C. to discuss with him about a case that seems related to a disappearance of a father and a daughter, saying that he has a theory. When Hotchner asks him why he is going by their superior Erin Strauss' orders not to work on the case with Hotchner's team, Cooper says that they are missing and no one is looking for them.

As Hotchner's team worked with the SFPD, Cooper and his team work in a warehouse, and sometimes Hotchner's team members would consult with them. He even goes with Hotchner to interview the wife of the missing husband and his daughter.

When Strauss call Hotchner about the status of the investigation, Cooper asks for the phone. Cooper then starts negotiating with her about staying in San Francisco and solving the case, and she eventually tells him, "Tell Agent Hotchner that I will deal with the two of you when you get back."

With the help of BAU technical analyst Penelope Garcia, they were able to identify the killer. When they get to the abandoned warehouse in which the killer is holding his hostages, the girl is gone, and the father tells him that he took her. Cooper commandeers a helicopter and finds the killer and the daughter. When the killer appears to jump off the roof, Emily Prentiss looks or his body, only to find that the killer is still alive and about to shoot her. Fortunately, however, sniper Mitch Rawson shoots the killer dead in the nick of time.

As Cooper's and Hotchner's teams celebrating the closure of the case, Strauss calls him, telling him to come back to work.

Criminal Minds: Suspect Behavior
In the show, Cooper is introduced as a gifted profiler in the mold of Criminal Minds first protagonist, Jason Gideon. He leads his team with dignity and respect as they work on cases.

In the episode "Death By a Thousand Cuts", Beth Griffith is kidnapped by a serial killer, and Cooper had to make a choice whether to sacrifice Beth or risk his career by killing the unsub's son. The episode ends with a cliffhanger and Beth's fate remains compromised.

References

Episode Sources

External links

Cooper
Criminal Minds characters
Television characters introduced in 2010
Fictional African-American people